An anti-submarine net or anti-submarine boom is a boom placed across the mouth of a harbour or a strait for protection against submarines. Net laying ships would be used to place and remove the nets. The US Navy used anti-submarine net in the Pacific War to protect major US Naval Advance Bases.  Some Net cutter submarines were used in the war.

Examples of anti-submarine nets
Lake Macquarie anti-submarine boom
Indicator net
Naval operations in the Dardanelles Campaign
Sydney Harbour anti-submarine boom net
Isle of Bute during World War II  -  Anti-submarine net in the Clyde Estuary in Scotland (Item 4)

See also

Anti-submarine warfare
Jumping wire (of a submarine)
Net cutter (submarine)
Net laying ship
Torpedo net

References  

Anti-submarine warfare
Anti-submarine weapons
Auxiliary gateship classes